Denver Air Connection is a subsidiary of Key Lime Air providing both charter and scheduled passenger air service.

History 
Key Lime Air, dba Denver Air Connection (DAC), operates FAR Part 121 regional airline scheduled passenger service and scheduled passenger air charter. DAC operates a public charter route between Grand Junction Regional Airport in western Colorado and Centennial Airport in the Denver area twice daily. DAC public-charter flights are operated with various aircraft, including Embraer ERJ-145 and Fairchild Dornier 328JET regional jets as well as Fairchild Swearingen Metroliner and Embraer EMB-120 Brasilia turboprops under FAR Part 135.

Denver Air Connection has an interline relationship with United Airlines enabling travelers to book flights through either Denver Air Connection or United's Global Network.

On 15 May 2019, the airline began service to Telluride Regional Airport also operating as Denver Air Connection and using the Fairchild Dornier 328JET. The service is the first jet service at the Telluride airport. On June 1, 2019, the airline began its first Essential Air Service (EAS) contract at Alliance Municipal Airport, under the Denver Air Connection brand, using the Fairchild Swearingen Metroliner. The service offers 12 weekly round trips to Denver. Only one of Key Lime Air's Metroliner is set up using the required 9-seat configuration.

In addition to the scheduled service DAC offers private charter on its various airframes.

Scheduled destinations 
Denver Air Connection serves the following destinations:

Former destinations

Accidents and incidents 
 14 April 2022: an Fairchild Metroliner registration N820DC, operating flight 4230 experienced a nose gear malfunction and collapse at slow speed following an aborted takeoff at Denver International Airport.  There were no injuries reported. .

References

External links
Official site

Regional airlines of the United States
Airlines based in Colorado
Airlines established in 1997